Primoris Services Corporation is a publicly traded specialty construction and infrastructure company based in the United States, with a particular focus on pipelines for natural gas, wastewater and water. As of 2014 it was a Fortune 1000 company.

History
The company was founded as ARB, Inc. in Bakersfield, California in 1960, and was organized as Primoris in Nevada in 2003. In 2008, it was incorporated as a public company in Delaware. Since then, it has expanded significantly through a number of significant acquisitions, including:

 James Construction Group LLC in 2009
 Rockford Corporation in 2010 for $82.6 million
 Sprint Pipeline Services, L.P. in 2012
 Q3 Contracting Inc., a gas pipeline service, in 2012 for $48.1 million in cash.

References

Companies based in Dallas
Construction and civil engineering companies established in 1960
Companies listed on the Nasdaq
Construction and civil engineering companies of the United States
1960 establishments in California